Roderick Arthur Francis Balfour, 5th Earl of Balfour (born 9 December 1948), is a British peer and businessman.

Biography
Balfour was born on 9 December 1948 in London to Eustace Arthur Goschen Balfour (1921–2000) and his wife, Anne (née Yule). Eustace Balfour was the son of Francis Balfour, nephew of Prime Minister Arthur Balfour, the first Earl of Balfour. He was educated at Eton College.

On 14 July 1971, Balfour married Lady Tessa Mary Isabel Fitzalan-Howard, eldest daughter of Miles Fitzalan-Howard, 17th Duke of Norfolk. They have four children:
 Lady Willa Anne Balfour (born 1973); married to George William Franks in 1997.
 Arthur Anthony Franks (born 1999)
 Violet Miriam Franks (born 2000)
 Esmé Alice Franks (born 2004)
 Lady Kinvara Clare Rachel Balfour (born 1975); married to Count Riccardo Lanza from 2009 to 2011.
 Marlowe Balfour Shahani (born 2018)
 Lady Maria Alice Jubilee Balfour (born 1977); married Charles Wigan in 2006.
 Aliena Mirabelle Wigan (born 2009)
 Caius Christian Wigan (born 2013)
 Lady Candida Rose Balfour (born 1984)

On 27 June 2003, Balfour succeeded his second cousin once removed Gerald as the Earl of Balfour. As he has no sons, his brother, the Hon. Charles George Yule Balfour (born 1951), is the heir presumptive.

Notes and references

Notes

References

1948 births
Living people
People educated at Eton College
5